Nogometni klub Vipava or simply NK Vipava is a Slovenian football club from Vipava. It competes in the Slovenian Third League under the name Fama Vipava due to sponsorship reasons. The club was established in 1996.

Vipava gained promotion to the third level after winning the 2014–15 Littoral League. Their home ground is Ob Beli Stadium with a capacity for 1,000 spectators (200 seats).

Honours
Littoral League (fourth tier)
 Winners: 2014–15

References

External links
Official website 
Soccerway profile

Association football clubs established in 1996
Football clubs in Slovenia
1996 establishments in Slovenia